Agremiação Esportiva Canedense, commonly known as Canedense, is a Brazilian football club based in Senador Canedo, Goiás state, where it competes at in the Campeonato Goiano, the Goiás state league.

History
The club was founded on June 15, 2005. They competed in the top division of Campeonato Goiano in 2007 and 2008, were relegated to the second division in 2009, returned to the top division in 2010, but fell to the third division by 2012. They have been in the third division, or playing local football, since.

Stadium
Agremiação Esportiva Canedense play their home games at Estádio Plínio José de Souza. The stadium has a maximum capacity of 3,000 people.

References

Association football clubs established in 2005
Football clubs in Goiás
2005 establishments in Brazil